Hougham Battery is a World War II coastal defence battery built in 1941 between Dover and Folkestone in southeast England.
It is on the cliff-edge between Abbot's Cliff and Shakespeare Cliff.

The battery is equipped with three 8-inch (203 mm) Mark VIII naval guns.
The complex was built in 1941 and manned by men of 520 Coastal Regiment Royal Artillery

The construction of the A20 in the 1970s caused most of the battery to be covered with earth, so little can be seen on the surface, though access is possible to the underground battery plotting room. Some of the observation posts on the cliff edge are also visible.

The batteries to the east and west of Dover were each designated as a fortress and each fortress had an underground plotting room from where the guns could be controlled.
At Hougham. there are No.1, No.2 and No.3 Gun emplacements.

The North Downs Way (long-distance path) leads over Round Down (on the Dover Cliffs) between Folkestone and Dover. 
The path passes by several observation posts of the battery.

See also
 South Foreland - site of a similar battery east of Dover
 Samphire Hoe - country park at the foot of the cliffs

External links
Gatekeepers - the Guns of Dover in WWII
Kent History Forum
Subterranea Britannica
Photos of West Shelter
Plotting Room phots

References

Forts in Dover, Kent
Military history of Dover, Kent
Artillery batteries